Massalongia is a genus of lichen-forming fungi in the family Massalongiaceae. It has four species. The genus was circumscribed by German lichenologist Gustav Wilhelm Körber in 1855, with M. carnosa assigned as the type species.

The genus name of Massalongia is in honour of Abramo Bartolommeo Massalongo (1824-1860), who was an Italian lichenologist.

Species
Massalongia carnosa 
Massalongia griseolobulata 
Massalongia microphylliza 
Massalongia patagonica

References

Peltigerales
Peltigerales genera
Lichen genera
Taxa described in 1855
Taxa named by Gustav Wilhelm Körber